Long Beach, California, held an election for Mayor of Long Beach, California, on April 12, 1994. It saw the election of Beverly O'Neill. The incumbent mayor, Ernie Kell, placed fifth.

References 

1994 California elections